The 2019 Wake Forest Demon Deacons men's soccer team represented Wake Forest University during the 2019 NCAA Division I men's soccer season. It was the 73rd season of the university fielding a program. It was the program's fifth season with Bobby Muuss as head coach. The Demon Deacons played their home matches at Spry Stadium.

Background

The 2018 Wake Forest men's soccer team finished the season with a 18–3–0 overall record and a 7–1–0 ACC record.  The Demon Deacons were seeded first–overall in the 2018 ACC Men's Soccer Tournament, where they defeated NC State in the Quarterfinals, but lost to eventual champions Louisville in the Semifinals.  The Demon Deacons earned an at-large bid into the 2018 NCAA Division I Men's Soccer Tournament.  As the first–overall seed in the tournament, Wake Forest defeated Colgate in the second round before being upset by eventual runners-up Akron in the third round.

At the end of the season, two Demon Deacons men's soccer players were selected in the 2019 MLS SuperDraft: Logan Gdula and Brad Dunwell.

Player movement

Players leaving

Players arriving

Squad

Roster 

Updated:August 19, 2019

Team management

Source:

Schedule

Source:

|-
!colspan=8 style=""| Exhibition

|-
!colspan=7 style=""| Regular season

|-
!colspan=6 style=""| ACC Tournament

|-
!colspan=6 style=""| NCAA Tournament

Awards and honors

2020 MLS Super draft

Source:

Rankings

References

2019
Wake Forest Demon Deacons
Wake Forest Demon Deacons
Wake Forest Demon Deacons men's soccer
Wake Forest Demon Deacons
2019 Wake Forest Demon Deacons